Clinical Medicine is a bimonthly peer-reviewed medical journal published by the Royal College of Physicians. It was established in 1966 as the Journal of the Royal College of Physicians of London. It carried both names between 1998 and 2000, and since 2001 it has appeared as Clinical Medicine. The editor-in-chief is Prof Anton Emmanuel.

Abstracting and indexing
The journal is abstracted and indexed in:

According to the Journal Citation Reports, the journal has a 2018 impact factor of 2.046, ranking it 58th out of 156 journals in the category "Medicine, General & Internal".

References

External links 
 

Royal College of Physicians
General medical journals
English-language journals
Bimonthly journals
Publications established in 1966